John Forest Ogilvie (28 October 1928 – 2 May 2020) was a Scottish footballer. Ogilvie played for Hibernian, Leicester City and Mansfield Town.

Career
Ogilvie worked as a joiner while playing junior football for Thorniewood United. He started his senior career when he joined Hibernian, and made his league debut in December 1948. He played for Hibs in their most successful era, as their "Famous Five" forward line won three Scottish league championships. Ogilvie made 35 league appearances in six seasons with the Hibs first team. Most of those (23) were in their league championship in 1950–51. His career was severely impacted when he suffered a broken leg while playing in a 1950–51 Scottish Cup semi-final. He did not play for over two years due to the injury, and only made one more appearance for Hibs (a league match against Rangers in April 1954).

He then had trials with Sheffield United, but signed instead for Leicester City (managed by Dave Halliday) in October 1955. He was a key player as Leicester were promoted as Second Division champions in 1957. Ogilvie made 82 league appearances and scored twice for Leicester. 

Ogilvie moved to Mansfield Town in January 1960. In two seasons at Mansfield he played in 24 first team league games during which he scored once. After a spell with non-league club Bedworth Town, he retired from playing football.

Later life and death
Following his retirement from playing football, Ogilvie lived in Leicester and worked in the knitwear and printing industries. He also maintained some involvement in football, earning a FA coaching badge and doing some scouting work for Leicester City manager Jock Wallace.

After he contracted COVID-19 at a care home in Leicester during the COVID-19 pandemic in England, Ogilvie died on 2 May 2020, aged 91. He was survived by his wife Doreen, and two granddaughters.

References

External links 
 

1928 births
2020 deaths
Footballers from Motherwell
Association football fullbacks
Scottish footballers
Hibernian F.C. players
Leicester City F.C. players
Mansfield Town F.C. players
Scottish Football League players
English Football League players
Thorniewood United F.C. players
Bedworth United F.C. players
Deaths from the COVID-19 pandemic in England
Scottish Junior Football Association players